Irishtown Township is one of fifteen townships in Clinton County, Illinois, USA.  As of the 2010 census, its population was 1,167 and it contained 832 housing units.

Geography

Cities, towns, villages
 Keyesport (southwest half)

Unincorporated towns
 Harbor Light Bay
 Marydale
 North Harbor
 Panorama Hills
(This list is based on USGS data and may include former settlements.)

Cemeteries
The township contains these three cemeteries: Gillespie, Keyesport and McNeill.

Major highways
  Illinois Route 127

Airports and landing strips
 Carrillon Airport

Landmarks
 Eldon Hazlet State Recreation Area (north three-quarters)

Demographics

School districts
 Carlyle Community Unit School District 1

Political districts
 Illinois' 19th congressional district
 State House District 107
 State Senate District 54

References
 
 United States Census Bureau 2007 TIGER/Line Shapefiles
 United States National Atlas

External links
 City-Data.com
 Illinois State Archives

Townships in Clinton County, Illinois
Townships in Illinois